This is a list of Turkish television related events from 2013.

Events
18 February - Mustafa Bozkurt wins the second season of O Ses Türkiye.

Debuts

Television shows

2010s
O Ses Türkiye (2011–present)

Ending this year

Births

Deaths

See also
2013 in Turkey

References